Julian Togelius is an associate professor at the Department of Computer Science and Engineering at the New York University Tandon School of Engineering.

Career
Togelius holds a BA from Lund University, an MSc from the University of Sussex, and a PhD from the University of Essex.

He was an associate professor at the Center for Computer Games Research, IT University of Copenhagen before moving to NYU.

Togelius is the editor in chief of the IEEE Transactions on Games journal. He is also, with Georgios N. Yannakakis, the co-author of the Artificial Intelligence and Games textbook and the co-organiser of the Artificial Intelligence and Games Summer School series.

Togelius co-edited the book Procedural Content Generation Book for games.

Research
Togelius was described by Kenneth O. Stanley as one of "the world's most accomplished experts at the intersection of games and AI". His research has appeared in media such as New Scientist, and Le Monde, The Verge, The Economist, and the MIT Technology Review.

References

Living people
Video game researchers
Alumni of the University of Sussex
Academic staff of the IT University of Copenhagen
New York University faculty
Swedish computer scientists
Swedish emigrants to the United States
Year of birth missing (living people)